Little Britain USA is an American spin-off-continuation of British sketch show, Little Britain, produced by and aired on HBO.

As in the British series, Matt Lucas and David Walliams play the majority of the characters: originals such as Lou and Andy, Daffyd Thomas, Sebastian Love, Emily Howard,  Marjorie Dawes and Vicky Pollard, as well as new characters not previously seen in the British series. The series is narrated by Tom Baker.

The first series started filming in March 2008 in Wilmington, North Carolina.
HBO showed the first episode of the season in the United States on September 28, 2008; The Movie Network broadcast it in Canada the same day, followed by BBC One on October 3 in the UK.

New guest-stars include Rosie O'Donnell, Rachael Harris, Bob Stephenson, Paul Rudd (as the President of France), Hilarie Burton, Vivica A. Fox, and Sting. Michael Patrick Jann served as executive producer of the series and directed the majority of the shows. David Schwimmer directed studio-based segments of the show.
Rosie O'Donnell also makes an appearance in a "Fat Fighters" segment.

The series was released on DVD in the United Kingdom by 2entertain on 24 November 2008.

Ratings
 The first episode attracted 540,000 viewers in the US and 4.7 million viewers in the UK (according to Digital Spy)
 The second episode, when shown in the UK, attracted 4.23 million viewers
 The third episode shown in the UK attracted 4.67 million viewers
 The fourth episode shown in the UK attracted 3.65 million viewers

Aborted second season
On November 27, 2008 on GMTV Matt Lucas announced plans for another season to air in 2009, but in July 2009, HBO announced the show would not return for a second season, but plan to work with Lucas and Walliams on other projects instead.

In Matt Lucas's autobiography, he wrote that HBO wanted to relaunch the show but first they wanted a ninety-minute special. Lucas and Walliams were reluctant to do ninety minutes of solid sketches and a counter-offer of doing two forty-five minute specials was turned down by the network.

Reception 

The show has received a generally mixed response from critics, garnering a 60% approval rating on review aggregator website Metacritic. Mirror wrote: "The sad truth is Little Britain's mix of Monty Python, Kenny Everett, and Dick Emery has run its course. One-joke characters like Lou and Andy and Carol 'computer says no' Beer are being flogged to death. Walliams and Lucas have spent so much time deciding which frocks to wear, they've forgotten to write any gags. And their desperation to be outrageous is now just shockingly tedious."

Main characters

Reprised characters
 Marjorie Dawes (works at an American branch of FatFighters in Delaware)
 Bubbles DeVere (goes on a luxury cruise to Rio de Janeiro)
 Vicky Pollard (goes to an American boot camp in Utah after being thrown out of Disney World)
 Daffyd Thomas (goes to university in America)
 Sebastian Love (becomes Prime Minister of the UK)
 Carol Beer (works at an American hospital in Pennsylvania)
 Lou Todd and Andy Pipkin (go on holiday in Mississippi)
 Harvey Pincher (visits his American relatives in Ohio)
 Emily Howard (goes to America, is arrested in Pittsburgh for shoplifting)
 Linda Flint (works at an American university, as does Martin)
 Kenny Craig (deleted Scene - goes grocery shopping and hypnotises a woman to go out with him)

New characters
 Mildred - A grandmother, played by Lucas, who shares strange and often inappropriate facts about her past with her grandson, Connor (Walliams).
 "Mark and Tom", aka the "Gym Buddies", two new bodybuilder characters who brag about their love lives, but reveal their homosexuality several times. In the final episode of the season, the one played by David Walliams reveals that he has had a sex-change operation.
 A "sweet" little school girl called Ellie-Grace who, while sharing love sentiments with her mother before parting with her for a short time, inadvertently comes up with some vulgar ones, often sex related, like, (I love you more than transsexual porn), shocking her mother, who starts to get more stern in reaction. In their final sketch, Ellie-Grace goes for a sleepover and her mother has warned her not to utter any vulgarities. As they are parting, however, her mother accidentally comes up with one herself, traumatising Ellie-Grace.
 Phyllis Church, a woman who owns a Cavalier King Charles Spaniel named "Mr. Doggy" (voiced by Walliams while playing Phyllis), and likes to talk to him, and imitate his replies. In each sketch, using her deep, Mr Doggy voice, commands herself to do anti-social deeds in public. These anti-social deeds involve taking off her clothes in public and standing in a trash bin, defecating in public and throwing a brick through a shop window.
 Bing Gordyn - the eighth man (out of nine men) on the moon and an American counterpart of Denver Mills. Bing tries to impress people with his expedition (by donning his spacesuit or by going on about his exploits, for example), to the extent of requesting plumbers for this purpose, but always fails to impress, most likely because the moon-landing era has faded away. In his final sketch he pulls a shotgun on a student writing an essay opining that NASA staged all the moon landings.
 A middle-aged British couple named George and Sandra, who appear in a series of sketches called "Forty Glorious Years". They visit America to celebrate their 40th anniversary. It seems clear, however, that their love died a long time ago - Sandra remains silent when George tries to make conversation (although she utters the word "ornithophobic" in their third appearance): they live permanently in an awkward silence, which makes George angry and verbally abusive to her. In their final sketch, they return to the UK and George insults her.
 A couple go through divorce because the female has realised her homosexuality. The sketch shows her throughout packing up, and her husband discovers many secrets she has kept from him pointing to this, such as merchandise from the LGBT related television show The L Word. He inadvertently uncovers a secret of his own, implying his own homosexuality.
 Senator White, an American counterpart of Sir Norman Fry; he attempts to cover up his homosexual experiences.
 A pair of hunters who shoot very small animals (such as mice or wasps) as though they were larger targets.
 A pair of bank-robbers too timid to actually rob a bank.
 Two couples on vacation who bump into one another and discover that both are called Steve and Wendy Ashby and live in exactly the same house.

Cast 
Matt Lucas
David Walliams
Tom Baker as the Narrator

Guest starring 
Peggy Miley as Anna from Fat Fighters
Brad Grunberg as Tony from Fat Fighters
Leslie Berger as a member of Fat Fighters
Geraldine James as Celia Pincher
Stevie Mack as a member of Fat Fighters
John Richard Petersen as a member of Fat Fighters
Matt Malloy
Nancy Lenehan as Kelly Pincher
Davenia McFadden as Boot Camp Overseer
Carla Jimenez as Helen Fisher
Matt McGrath
Amy Tipton
Tom Bower as Pastor
Julie Brister as a member of Fat Fighters
Preston Corbell
Matt Walsh as Business Man at the Urinal/Senator's Press Rep
Kevin Gould as Handsome Male Student
Robert Vaughn
Paul Getty
Donna Hardy as Ellie Grace's Grandma
Ethan LePhong as Darren Chow
Toshi Toda as Japanese Prime Minister Udagawa
Willie Amakye as President of Ghana
David Bowe
James Storm
Hilarie Burton as Lesbian College Student

Special Guests 
Rosie O'Donnell as Herself
Harry Lennix as the United States President (Possible parody of Barack Obama)
Ann Cusack as Mom of Little Girl
Vivica A. Fox as the First Lady
Paul Rudd as the French President
Sting as Himself
Terry Bowden as Church Member

Episodes

References

External links
 Official website
 

2008 American television series debuts
2008 American television series endings
2000s American sketch comedy television series
English-language television shows
HBO original programming
Little Britain
American television series based on British television series
Television shows filmed in North Carolina
Television shows filmed in Wilmington, North Carolina

de:Little Britain#Little Britain USA